Nogometni klub Bistrica, commonly referred to as NK Bistrica or simply Bistrica, is a Slovenian football club based in the town of Slovenska Bistrica. The club was established in 1958. They are currently named Kety Emmi & Impol Bistrica due to sponsorship reasons.

Honours
Slovenian Third League (East)
 Winners: 2021–22

Slovenian Fourth Division
 Winners: 1998–99, 2000–01, 2009–10

League history since 1991

References

External links
Official website 

Association football clubs established in 1958
Football clubs in Slovenia
1958 establishments in Slovenia